Willi Wigold (10 December 1909 – 28 November 1944) was a German footballer who played as a forward for Fortuna Düsseldorf and the Germany national team. He joined Fortuna Düsseldorf in 1930 and was part of the team that won the 1933 German football championship. He played four matches for Germany between 1932 and 1934.

Wigold was a corporal in the German army in World War II and died at Lake Ilmen during the Russian campaign. The exact date of his death is disputed, with some sources listing 12 August 1943.

References

1909 births
1944 deaths
Association football forwards
German footballers
Germany international footballers
Fortuna Düsseldorf players
German Army soldiers of World War II
German Army personnel killed in World War II
Footballers from Düsseldorf
Military personnel from Düsseldorf